Edward S. Murphy (February 1, 1905 in La Crosse, Wisconsin – September 20, 1973 in Bellwood, Illinois) was an American speed skater who competed in the 1928 and 1932 Winter Olympics.

In 1928 he finished fifth in the 1500 metres event, tenth in the 500 metres competition, and 14th in the 5000 metres event.

Four years later he won the silver medal in the 5000 metres competition.

External links
 Profile
 Speed skating 1928+1932 

1905 births
1973 deaths
American male speed skaters
Speed skaters at the 1928 Winter Olympics
Speed skaters at the 1932 Winter Olympics
Medalists at the 1932 Winter Olympics
Olympic silver medalists for the United States in speed skating
Sportspeople from La Crosse, Wisconsin
People from Bellwood, Illinois